Yianni or Giannis Perkatis (born 8 March 1994) is an Australian football (soccer) player who plays as a central midfielder for Sydney United 58 FC.

Club career
In 2012, he made one appearance for National Premier Leagues NSW side Blacktown City.

On 29 March 2013 Perkatis made his A-League debut for Western Sydney Wanderers against the Newcastle Jets.

On 13 May 2015 Perkatis was released from his contract with Western Sydney two weeks early to allow him to join Blacktown City.

In June 2016, Perkatis joined Cypriot Second Division side Ethnikos Assia FC on a free transfer. After impressing with his limited opportunities in Cyprus, he was forced to depart the club over unpaid wages on the duration of his contract.

In January 2017, Perkatis joined Global FC as AFC Champions League qualifications loomed. However the club did not qualify and substantially released all their foreign players due to financial restrictions.

In March 2017, Perkatis joined National Premier Leagues NSW side Sydney United, establishing himself as one of the key midfielders for the club.

In July 2020, Perkatis returned to the A-League, joining Perth Glory on a short-term league until the end of the season. He rejoined Sydney United at the end of the 2019–20 A-League.

Honours

Club
Western Sydney Wanderers 
 AFC Champions League: 2014

Sydney United:
  National Premier Leagues NSW Championship: 2020

References

External links
 footballaustralia.com.au profile

1994 births
Australian people of Greek descent
Association football defenders
Australian Institute of Sport soccer players
A-League Men players
Blacktown City FC players
Western Sydney Wanderers FC players
Sydney United 58 FC players
Perth Glory FC players
Soccer players from Sydney
Living people
National Premier Leagues players
Australian soccer players